Alwin Plank (4 April 1931 – 5 April 2019) was an Austrian ski jumper who competed from 1953 to 1961. He won the 1959-60 Four Hills Tournament event in Bischofshofen. Plank also finished 14th in the ski jumping event at the 1960 Winter Olympics in Squaw Valley. He was born in Hohenems.

References

Sports-Reference.com profile
Alwin Plank's obituary

1931 births
2019 deaths
Austrian male ski jumpers
Olympic ski jumpers of Austria
Ski jumpers at the 1960 Winter Olympics
People from Hohenems
Sportspeople from Vorarlberg
20th-century Austrian people